Budhakhol is a heritage site of Odisha located in Buguda block of Ganjam District in Odisha, India. It is located about 92 km away from the district headquarters. The old heritage is known for its beautiful trees, caves, temples and perennial waterfall which attracts tourists. Another attraction point of the place is the presence of a group of five temples. The five temples are Sri Sri Makareswar Swami, Sri Sri Gangadhareswar Swami, Sri Sri Jagadieshwar Swami, Sri Sri Siddheswar Swami, Sri Sri Budheswar Swami, which is popularly known as Panchu Mahadeva Temple.

History
The name of the place Budhakhol is derived from Badhesvara, which means Buddha in meditating position. It is strongly believed that Buddha visited the place. Huentsang also visited the place and witnessed the learning and teaching of Buddhists and believed that it was one of the best place to learn Buddhism. The Panchumahadeva temples are believed to be built in the era of Jagadguru AdiShankaracharya. Hence the place is a mix of both Buddhism and Hinduism.

Tourism
Budhakhol is widely known for its Buddhist culture. A number of Buddhist remains found at the place which gives the impression about Buddhist settlement at the place. The main attraction point of this place is the combination of caves, jungles and water falls, along with it the combination of bunch of five temples makes the place a must visit for pilgrims too.
42 Feet Height Statues of Lord Shiva and Parvati donated by Indian Princess Ipsita Pati at Budhakhol, Buguda, Odisha.
The main attractions of the place are:

The Cave
Budhakhol is a science spot frequently visited by tourists, pilgrims and picnickers. The caves are one of the most attractive point of the place. The place is located at a distance about 3 km. towards the north of Buguda in Ganjam District. While climbing to the top of the hill, one can notice a very big stone on south, which is called Patharakhai. In the same hill tourist can find different caves. One of which are Siddha Gumpha where the Buddhist monks are usedo stay and meditate. Another cave named Dayana is also present on the main hills.
Statue of Siva.Parbati..Brusava ...Hanuman...Swimming pool...Hilltop road to temple...about 495steps to temple..etc...

Waterfalls
At the uppermost part of the hills a perennial stream forms a waterfall, named Panjuria. Water from the falls trickles down from 25 feet on the Banyan tree and converts itself into a shower. Water of the Panjuria waterfall is believed to carry medicinal properties.

Festivals
Maghasaptami
Samba Dashami
Rath yatra
Danda Yatra (April)
Durga Puja
Kalipuja
Bolbam
Kartikapurnami
Mahasivaratri

References

Budhakhola.Facebook

Tourist attractions in Odisha
Buddhist sites in Odisha
Ganjam district

42 Feet Height Statues of Lord Shiva and Parvati donated by Indian Princess Ipsita Pati at Budhakhol, Buguda, Odisha.
http://www.dharitri.com/e-Paper/Berhampur/220716/p9.htm